Estrogenic fat is a form of adipose tissue (or subcutaneous fat) which develops under the influence of estrogen, and particularly estradiol, in women.


Natural physiology

Estrogenic fat is a feminine secondary sex characteristic which develops at puberty and is maintained by estradiol throughout a woman's fertile years.

A special form of estrogenic fat is the iliac (hip) fat layer, which normally occurs below the iliac crest in females of childbearing age. Its cells contain a wider variety of fatty acids than most adipose tissues do. During the middle trimester of fetal development, when certain long-chain fatty acids are needed for organ development, the mother's iliac fat layer supplies these acids. Women who lack this normal layer are at increased risk of giving birth to underdeveloped newborns.

Estrogen Levels Pre- and Post-Menopause 
There is a correlation between estradiol and estrone presence in adipose tissue in both pre- and post-menopausal women. Pre-menopausal women have higher levels of hormones including estrogen. After menopause, estrogenic fat diminishes, and lower levels of both estradiol and estrone are found in breast adipocytes, with a more pronounced decrease in estradiol levels.

References

Endocrinology
Human anatomy